First Free Will Baptist Church may refer to a building in the United States:

First Free Will Baptist Church and Vestry, Ashland, New Hampshire
First Freewill Baptist Church (East Alton, New Hampshire)
First Free Will Baptist Church in Meredith, New Hampshire
First Free Will Baptist Church (Ossipee, New Hampshire)